Sierra de Cazorla is a mountain range of the Prebaetic System in the Jaén Province in Spain. It is named after the town of Cazorla. Its highest point is the 1,847 m high Gilillo peak.

Geography
This mountain range is located between the Sierra Nevada, the Sierra de Segura, and Sierra del Pozo mountain ranges. The easiest route to reach it is from Cazorla town.

The Santuario de la Virgen de Tíscar is a shrine dedicated to the Virgin Mary, located on a mountain pass in Sierra de Cazorla.

See also
Baetic System
Las Villas
Sierras de Cazorla, Segura y Las Villas Natural Park

References

External links 

Asociación para el Desarollo Rural de la Sierra de Cazorla
 
 Parque Natural Sierras de Cazorla, Segura y Las Villas
 Turismo Activo en el Parque Natural de las Sierras de Cazorla, Segura y Las Villas

Cazorla
Cazorla